Giulio Favale (born 25 January 1998) is an Italian football player who plays as a midfielder for  club Virtus Entella.

Club career
He made his professional debut in the Serie B for Pisa on 24 December 2016 in a game against Spezia.

On 26 July 2019, he signed a 3-year contract with Reggiana.

On 20 January 2020, he was loaned to Pistoiese.

On 17 September 2020, he was loaned to Cesena. On 31 August 2021, his contract with Reggiana was terminated by mutual consent.

On 26 September 2021 he returned to Cesena on a one-season deal.

On 29 June 2022 Favale signed with Virtus Entella.

References

External links
 

1998 births
Living people
Sportspeople from Pisa
Italian footballers
Association football midfielders
Serie B players
Serie C players
Pisa S.C. players
U.S. Gavorrano players
S.S.D. Lucchese 1905 players
A.C. Reggiana 1919 players
U.S. Pistoiese 1921 players
Cesena F.C. players
Virtus Entella players
Footballers from Tuscany